Crowfoot is a locality in Alberta, Canada.

The community has the name of Crowfoot, an Indian chief.

References 

Localities in Wheatland County, Alberta